Wong Nai Uk, also transliterated as Wong Nei Uk is a village in Tung Chung on Lantau Island, Hong Kong.

Administration
Wong Nei Uk Tau is a recognized village under the New Territories Small House Policy.

References

External links
 Delineation of area of existing village Ma Wan and Wong Nai Uk (Tung Chung) for election of resident representative (2019 to 2022)

Villages in Islands District, Hong Kong
Tung Chung